The Volksgarten (or ) is a public park in the Neustadt-Süd district of Cologne, Germany.

It is used for various social activities through the year and can have more than 10.000 visitors at certain days.

Location 
The western rim of the park is a railroad traversing Cologne coming east from the South Bridge and merging with the main and most frequented railroad coming from Bonn in the south and then surrounding most of the city center of Cologne.

Fountain 

The Volksgarten contains a fountain.

Children's playground 
There is a dedicated playground for children, partially fenced. with ample sand, various climbing frames, benches for adults and so on in the north of the pond in the center of the park, not far from Voklsgartenstraße.

Rose Garden
The park is well known for its beautiful rose garden in its south western edge near the eastern end of Eifelwall at Eifelstraße behind the stacked railway bridges.

History
Most of the Volksgarten area was originally used for fortifications. A fortress wall was built on the western side of park. Remains of a small fort still exists in the center of the park.

Gallery

External links
 

Cologne
Urban public parks
Parks in Germany
Innenstadt, Cologne